Peristera Peak is the rocky peak rising to 2142 m in Owen Ridge, the southernmost portion of the main ridge of Sentinel Range in Ellsworth Mountains, Antarctica.  It overlooks lower Nimitz Glacier to the southwest and upper Wessbecher Glacier to the northeast.

The peak is named after the ancient and medieval fortress of Peristera in Southern Bulgaria.

Location
US mapping in 1961 and 1988.

See also
 Mountains in Antarctica

Maps
 Vinson Massif.  Scale 1:250 000 topographic map.  Reston, Virginia: US Geological Survey, 1988.
 Antarctic Digital Database (ADD). Scale 1:250000 topographic map of Antarctica. Scientific Committee on Antarctic Research (SCAR). Since 1993, regularly updated.

Notes

References
 Peristera Peak. SCAR Composite Gazetteer of Antarctica
 Bulgarian Antarctic Gazetteer. Antarctic Place-names Commission. (in Bulgarian)
 Basic data (in English)

External links
 Peristera Peak. Copernix satellite image

Ellsworth Mountains
Bulgaria and the Antarctic
Mountains of Ellsworth Land